Meckenheim is a town in the Rhein-Sieg district, in North Rhine-Westphalia, Germany. It is situated approximately 15 km south-west of Bonn.

Notable people 
 Norbert Röttgen (born 1965), politician (CDU)

References